Lavandeira may refer to:

Places

Brazil
 Lavandeira, Tocantins, a municipality in the State of Tocantins

Portugal
 Lavandeira (Carrazeda de Ansiães), a civil parish in the municipality of Carrazeda de Ansiães

People
 Mario Lavandeira (born 1978), known professionally as Perez Hilton, American blogger, columnist, and media personality
 Petter Gonzalo Rocha Lavandeira (born 1984), better known as Petter Rocha, Uruguayan professional football player